Oksana Kalashnikova and Marta Sirotkina were the defending champions, having won the event in 2012, but both players chose not to defend their title.

Lyudmyla and Nadiya Kichenok won the title, defeating Nina Bratchikova and Valeria Solovyeva in the final, 6–2, 6–2.

Seeds

Draw

References 
 Draw

President's Cup - Women's Doubles
2013 Women's Doubles